Windthorst may refer to:

Ludwig Windthorst (1812-1891), German politician
Windthorst, Texas, town named after him
Windthorst, Saskatchewan, town named after him
Former German name for today's Nova Topola in the municipality of Gradiška, Republika Srpska, Bosnia and Herzegovina

See also
Windhorst (disambiguation)